Gimpo is a city in South Korea. It may also refer to:

 Gimpo Airport in Seoul, South Korea
 An alias for Alan Goodrick, associate of the band The KLF